Qi County or Qixian is a county in the north of Henan province, China. It is under the administration of the Hebi city. Qi County is the location of Zhaoge, the former capital of the Shang Dynasty.

Administrative divisions
As 2012, this county is divided to 4 subdistricts, 4 towns and 1 townships.
Subdistricts

Towns

Townships
Huangdong Township

Climate

References

County-level divisions of Henan
Hebi